Dramarama is a 2001 Icelandic comedy-drama film directed by Inga Lísa Middleton, Dagur Kári, Ragnar Bragason, Ásgrímur Sverrisson and Einar Thór Gunnlaugsson. It consists of five intertwined episodes, each made by a different director, set in Reykjavík during a power outage. The stories focus on a blind man, a pregnant girl, the driver of a hearse, two recently engaged lovers and a rock band. The film was produced by Zik Zak Filmworks with support from the Icelandic Film Fund.

The film was released in Iceland on 19 January 2001. It was nominated for the Edda Award for best film, screenplay and supporting actor (Björn J. Friðbjörnsson).

Segments
 "Aumingjaskápurinn" - directed by Ragnar Bragason
 "Líkið í lestinni" - directed by Dagur Kári
 "Mömmuklúbburinn" - directed by Inga Lísa Middleton
 "Heimsyfirráð eða bleyjuskiptingar" - directed by Ásgrímur Sverrisson
 "Guð hrapar úr vélinni" - directed by Einar Thor Gunnlaugsson

Cast
 Björn J. Friðbjörnsson as Ívar
 Inga Maria Valdimarsdóttir as Ívar's girlfriend
 Henrik Baldvin Björnsson as the ghost
 Megas as the voice of conscience
 Ingvar Eggert Sigurðsson as Sölvi
 Hafdís Huld as Silja
 Álfrún Örnólfsdóttir as Tóta
 Guðrún María Bjarnadóttir as Birna
 Ragnheiður Steindórsdóttir as Steinka
 Guðrún Gísladóttir as Tóta's mother
 Ari Gunnar Þorsteinsson as Tóta's brother
 Sverrir Bollason as cute boy #1
 Markús Bjarnason as cute boy #2
 Edda Björgvinsdóttir as Hanna
 Eggert Þorleifsson as Albert

References

External links
 Dramarama at the production company's website

2001 comedy-drama films
2001 films
Icelandic anthology films
Films directed by Dagur Kári
Films directed by Ragnar Bragason
Films set in Iceland
2000s Icelandic-language films
Icelandic comedy-drama films